Liga Deportiva Universitaria de Quito's 1992 season was the club's 62nd year of existence, the 39th year in professional football, and the 32nd in the top level of professional football in Ecuador.

Kits
Sponsor(s): Banco de la Producción, Philips

Squad

Competitions

Serie A

First stage

Results

Second stage

Results

Liguilla Final

Results

External links

RSSSF - 1992 Serie A 

1992